Mount Fernow is a  mountain summit located  northeast of Skykomish, in eastern King County of Washington state.

Description
The nearest higher neighbor is "K9",  to the southeast. The Mount Fernow Potholes are a series of lakes approximately one mile north of this peak. This mountain's name was officially adopted in 1967 by the U.S. Board on Geographic Names. The name honors Bernhard Fernow (1851–1923), who was the third chief of the Division of Forestry of the United States. This mountain is one of two peaks in Washington state named for Bernhard Fernow, the other being Mount Fernow  to the northeast in the Entiat Mountains.

Climate

Mount Fernow is located in the marine west coast climate zone of western North America. Most weather fronts originate in the Pacific Ocean, and travel northeast toward the Cascade Mountains. As fronts approach, they are forced upward by the peaks of the Cascade Range, causing them to drop their moisture in the form of rain or snowfall onto the Cascades (Orographic lift). As a result, the west side of the Cascades experiences high precipitation, especially during the winter months in the form of snowfall. During winter months, weather is usually cloudy, but, due to high pressure systems over the Pacific Ocean that intensify during summer months, there is often little or no cloud cover during the summer. Because of maritime influence, snow tends to be wet and heavy, resulting in avalanche danger. Precipitation runoff from the mountain drains into tributaries of the Skykomish River.

Geology
Mt. Fernow is composed of tonalite of the Mount Stuart batholith. The history of the formation of the Cascade Mountains dates back millions of years ago to the late Eocene Epoch. With the North American Plate overriding the Pacific Plate, episodes of volcanic igneous activity persisted. In addition, small fragments of the oceanic and continental lithosphere called terranes created the North Cascades about 50 million years ago.

During the Pleistocene period dating back over two million years ago, glaciation advancing and retreating repeatedly scoured and shaped the landscape. The "U"-shaped cross section of the river valleys are a result of that recent glaciation. Uplift and faulting in combination with glaciation have been the dominant processes which have created the tall peaks and deep valleys of the Cascades.

See also

 Geology of the Pacific Northwest

References

External links
 Weather forecast: Mt. Fernow
Wild Sky Wilderness (Mt. Baker-Snoqualmie National Forest) U.S. Forest Service

Mountains of Washington (state)
Mountains of King County, Washington
Cascade Range
Mount Baker-Snoqualmie National Forest
North American 1000 m summits